Botanical gardens in Singapore have collections consisting entirely of Singapore native and endemic species; most have a collection that include plants from around the world. There are botanical gardens and arboreta in all states and territories of Singapore, most are administered by local governments, some are privately owned.

 Singapore Botanic Gardens
 Gardens by the Bay

References 

Singapore
Botanical gardens